Atiqullah Raufi was the chief of the secretariat of the Supreme Court of Afghanistan. He was assassinated as he was heading to work on December 13, 2014, around 9:00 a.m., in Kabul, Afghanistan. The Taliban claimed responsibility for the incident.

The attack was one in a series of attacks targeting Afghanistan's legal system in 2013–2015.

See also
Taliban insurgency

References

2014 deaths
Year of birth missing
2014 in Afghanistan
Terrorist incidents in Afghanistan in 2014
Assassinations in Afghanistan
Supreme Court of Afghanistan